Jelena Dokić was the defending champion, but chose not to participate. 
Iryna Brémond defeated Stéphanie Foretz Gacon in the final 6–4, 6–7(1–7), 6–2.

Seeds

Main draw

Finals

Top half

Bottom half

References
 Main Draw
 Qualifying Draw

Open 88 Contrexeville - Singles